Robert de Beaumont, Count of Meulan (c. 1142 – 1204, Poitiers, France), was the son of Waleran IV de Beaumont and Agnes de Montfort.

Family and children
Around 1165 Robert married Maud of Cornwall, daughter of Reginald de Dunstanville, 1st Earl of Cornwall and Beatrice Fitz Richard. They had:

 Mabel de Beaumont, married William de Redvers, 5th Earl of Devon.
 Galeran V de Beaumont, Count of Meulan, married Margaret de Fougeres
 Peter (or Pierre) of Meulan, Dean of Wimborne, Vicar of Sturminster Marshall, Dorset.
 Henry (or Henri) of Meulan
 Agnes of Meulan, married Guy de la Roche Guyon V in 1192. 
 Jeanne of Meulan, married Robert II d'Harcourt.

References

Sources

External links
Robert de Beaumont at thePeerage.com

Counts of Meulan
1140s births
1204 deaths
Robert